The British Shipping (Assistance) Act 1935 was an Act of Parliament which subsidized the British shipping industry during the Great Depression. £10,000,000 was given to allow the building or modernization of tramp markets.

References

United Kingdom Acts of Parliament 1935
1930s economic history
Shipping in the United Kingdom